Interferon alpha-inducible protein 6 is a protein that in humans is encoded by the IFI6 gene.

This gene was first identified as one of the many genes induced by interferon. The encoded protein may play a critical role in the regulation of apoptosis. A mini-satellite that consists of 26 repeats of a 12 nucleotide repeating element resembling the mammalian splice donor consensus sequence begins near the end of the second exon. Alternatively spliced transcript variants that encode different isoforms by using the two downstream repeat units as splice donor sites have been described.

An antiviral function has been attributed to IFI6 against several members of theFlaviviridae family (DENV, YFV, ZIKV, WNV). IFI6 was able to interfere with the virus replication by preventing the formation of virus-induced membrane structures that represent a replication organelle.

References

Further reading